The San Francisco Bay Naval Shipyard was a short-lived shipyard formed in 1965 with the combination of the Hunters Point Naval Shipyard and the Mare Island Naval Shipyard. The combined yards were the largest naval shipyard in the world, but the desired cost savings did not materialize, and the two yards reverted to separate management in February 1970. The Hunters Point shipyard was used for radioactive testing when the United States was testing the atomic bombs. The site has since been contaminated. The Hunters Point Naval Shipyard became a Superfund site, as designated by the Environmental Protection Agency (EPA). It is the Navy's requirement to clean up the site to "reasonable" levels to those who live adjacent to the shipyard.

The two shipyards were called:
San Francisco Bay Naval Shipyard Hunters Point Division  (San Francisco Naval Shipyard)
San Francisco Bay Naval Shipyard Mare Island Division

Pacific Reserve Fleet, San Francisco
Pacific Reserve Fleet, San Francisco Group was the combination United States Navy reserve fleets of mothballed stored ships and submarines. Pacific Reserve Fleet, San Francisco Group being made of the Pacific Reserve Fleet, Mare Island and Pacific Reserve Fleet, Hunters Point (Pacific Reserve Fleet, San Francisco Group may also refer to only the Reserve Fleet at Hunters Point). Some ships in the fleet were reactivated for the Vietnam War.

See also
Rosie the Riveter/World War II Home Front National Historical Park
California during World War II

References

History of San Francisco
United States Navy shipyards

Military installations closed in 1970 
Closed installations of the United States Navy